Psilocybe fimetaria is a  psilocybin mushroom,  having psilocybin and psilocin as main active compounds. It grows exclusively on horse and cow dung.

Etymology
From the words fim (fringed), et and aria (place).

Description

Cap: 1.5 — 3.5 cm in diameter, papillate to convex, becoming umbonate to broadly convex in age. Surface even to translucent-striate near the margin, viscid when moist from a thick separable gelatinous pellicle. Often velar remnants on surface, typically around the margin. Pale reddish brown to ochraceous, hygrophanous, fading in drying to yellowish olive to ochraceous buff. Flesh whitish to honey colored.
Gills: Adnexed, free or sinuate. Close, interleaving and ventricose. Whitish clay at first, eventually dark reddish brown with olivaceous hue, white fimbriate.
Spore Print: Dark purple-brown, (9.5)12.5 — 15(16) x 6.5 — 9.5 µm,  ovoid in front view, ellipsoid in side view, thick walled with a broad germ pore.
Stem: 2 – 9 cm long by (0.5)2 – 4 mm thick. Cylindrical, flexuous, equal but sometimes slightly swollen at the base. Whitish at first, soon discolouring yellow to yellowish brown from handling, reddish brown or honey brown in age, sometimes with distinctive blue tones at the base. Surface covered with whitish fibrils towards the apex, with an apical evanescent fibrillose annulus that develops from a thickly cortinate partial veil.
Odor: Farinaceous
Taste: Farinaceous
Microscopic features: Basidia 4-spored. Pleurocystidia absent. Cheilocystidia (15)20 — 30(35) by (4)6 — 8(9) µm, ventricose-fusiform or lageniform with a narrow neck, often flexuous, 4 — 15 by 0.5 — 1.5 µm, occasionally branched.

Habitat and distribution
Psilocybe fimetaria is found growing solitary to gregariously on horse or cow dung, in grassy areas, from September to November. Psilocybe semilanceata may be an indicator species for Psilocybe fimetaria, as they favour similar grasses, soil types and climatic conditions. It is widely distributed but not very common.

It has been recorded in Great Britain and much of mainland Europe. Despite what much of the literature states, there have not been confirmed recordings of Psilocybe fimetaria in Asia or the Americas.

Similar species
Psilocybe fimetaria is phylogenetically a close relative of Psilocybe liniformans. Not only do they often grow in the same habitat, but they are macroscopically similar. The best way to differentiate the species by testing for the presence of separable gelatinous threads running along the bottom edge of the gills. This feature would indicate Psilocybe liniformans.

Deconica coprophila can also appear similar but can be distinguished by its adnate or subdecurrent gill attachment, less-dense gill spacing and its cap being a deeper red colour.

Gallery

References

External links
Psilocybe fimetaria image
 Psilocybe fimetaria image

Entheogens
Psychoactive fungi
fimetaria
Psychedelic tryptamine carriers
Coprophagous organisms